Psammoryctides is a genus of annelids belonging to the family Naididae.

The species of this genus are found in Eurasia and Northern America.

Species:
 Psammoryctides albicola Michaelsen, 1901 
 Psammoryctides batillifer Schmankewicz, 1873 
 Psammoryctides barbatus Grube, 1860 
 Psammoryctides californianus Brinkhurst, 1965 
 Psammoryctides convolutus Loden, 1978 
 Psammoryctides deserticola Grimm, 1876 
 Psammoryctides hadzii Karaman, 1974 
 Psammoryctides hrabei Karaman, 1974 
 Psammoryctides lastoschkini Jarošenko, 1948 
 Psammoryctides longicapillatus Martínez-Ansemil & Giani, 1983 
 Psammoryctides moravicus Hrabě, 1934 
 Psammoryctides ochridanus Hrabě, 1931 
 Psammoryctides remifer Schmankewicz, 1873 
 Psammoryctides stankoi Karaman, 1974

References

Naididae